Joseph Gerard may refer to:

Joseph Gérard (1831–1914), French Catholic missionary
Joe Gerard, a fictional character on the TV series Rhoda